Soul Deeper... Songs From the Deep South is the tenth studio album by Australian rock singer Jimmy Barnes. Following the success of his 1991 album Soul Deep, Barnes returned with another album of soul covers. A special 2CD edition was released, featuring five bonus tracks. It was certified Platinum by ARIA in Australia.

Track listing
"Land of 1000 Dances" (Chris Kenner) – 2:35
"Chain of Fools" (Don Covay) – 3:21
"What Becomes of the Broken Hearted" (William Weatherspoon, Paul Riser, James Dean) – 3:36
"To Love Somebody" (Barry & Robin Gibb) – 3:51
"634-5789 (Soulsville, U.S.A.)" (Eddie Floyd, Steve Cropper) – 3:06
"Ain't Too Proud to Beg" (Norman Whitfield, Eddie Holland) – 2:56
"I Put a Spell on You" (Screamin' Jay Hawkins) – 2:42
"Money" (Berry Gordy, Janie Bradford) – 2:33
"Hold On, I'm Coming" (Isaac Hayes, David Porter) – 2:41
"Dancing in the Street" (Marvin Gaye, Ivy Jo Hunter, Mickey Stevenson) – 2:57
"All the Young Dudes" (David Bowie) – 3:24
"Respect" (Otis Redding) – 2:35

Limited edition 2CD 	
"Rip It Up" (Robert Blackwell, John Marascalco) – 2:10
"I'll Go Crazy" (James Brown) – 2:46
"Who's Making Love" (Homer Banks, Bettye Crutcher, Don Davis, Raymond Jackson) – 3:18
"Is This Love" (Bob Marley) – 5:24
"Hound Dog" (Jerry Leiber, Mike Stoller) – 2:44

Charts and certifications

Weekly charts
Soul Deeper... Songs from the Deep South debuted and peaked at number 3 in Australia.

Year-end charts

Certifications

Personnel
Credits adapted from AllMusic.

Jimmy Barnes - lead vocals
Sweet Pea Atkinson - backing vocals
Alexandra Brown - backing vocals
James Gadson - drums
Mark Lizotte - guitar
Reggie McBride - bass
Johnny Lee Schell - guitar
Lee Thornburg - trombone, trumpet
Mick Weaver - keyboards
David Woodford - saxophone
Technical
Dana Pilson - production coordination
Mark Dearnley - engineering, mixing
Howard Karp - assistant engineer
Cameron Moss - design
Jean Smith - photography

References

2000 albums
Jimmy Barnes albums
Albums produced by Don Gehman
Covers albums
Mushroom Records albums